Manley Ottmer Hudson (May 19, 1886 – April 13, 1960) was an American lawyer specializing in public international law. He was a judge at the Permanent Court of International Justice, a member of the International Law Commission, and a mediator in international conflicts. The American Society of International Law named a medal after him; as did Harvard University and University of Missouri School of Law with a professorship. He was nominated twice for the Nobel peace prize.

Biography

Early life and education

Hudson was born in Saint Peters, Missouri. He studied at the William Jewell College in Liberty, Missouri, achieving bachelor in 1906 and master in 1907. While at William Jewell, Hudson was initiated into the Alpha-Omega chapter of the Kappa Sigma Fraternity. In 1910 he earned a LL.B. from Harvard Law School, as well as a S.J.D. in 1917. He received further PhDs from William Jewell College (1928), the University of Missouri (1931), and the University of Delaware (1934).

Career

He became professor at Harvard in 1919, heading the department of international law from 1923 to 1954. He also was a guest lecturer at the Hague Academy of International Law (1925), the University of Calcutta (1927), and the Graduate Institute of International Studies in 1936. Furthermore, he was an advisor and member of the law department of the League of Nations, the United States Department of State, and others.

He became editor of the American Journal of International Law in 1924. Hudson married Janet Norton Aldrich in 1930 and was the father of two sons, Manley Ottmer, Jr. and Peter.

A member of the Permanent Court of Arbitration since 1933, he became a judge at the Permanent Court of International Justice in 1936 and held that position until the dissolution of that court in 1946. Since 1936, he was an associate of the Institut de Droit International. He also was an advisor and lecturer for international law at the Naval War College from 1946 to 1952. From 1949 to 1952, he was president of the American Society of International Law and first chairman of the International Law Commission. He was appointed Special Rapporteur for the study of nationality including statelessness by the International Law Commission on 26 July 1951.

Death and legacy

He retired in 1954, and died in Cambridge, Massachusetts in 1960.

His widow gave his collected 18000 letters, notes, and manuscripts to the library of Harvard in 1964. He left his collection of 1000 law books to the American Society of International Law, which created the Manley-O.-Hudson medal in his honor. He was nominated for the Nobel peace prize in 1933 and 1951. His successor at Harvard was Louis Bruno Sohn.

Works

 The Permanent Court of International Justice and the Question of American Participation. Cambridge, MA: Harvard University Press, 1925.
 Current International Cooperation. Calcutta, India: Calcutta University Press, 1927.
 Progress in International Organisation. Stanford, CA: Stanford University Press, 1932.
 By Pacific Means. New Haven, CT: Yale University Press, 1935.
International Legislation (Carnegie Endowment for International Peace, 1937, co-edited with Ruth E. Bacon) and 
World Court Reports: A Collection of the Judgments, Orders and Opinions of the Permanent Court of International Justice. Volume III, 1932-1935 (Carnegie Endowment for International Peace, 1938, co-edited with Ruth E.Bacon)
 The Permanent Court of International Justice 1920-1942. New York: Macmillan, 1943.

References

External links
 ASIL Presidents: Manley Ottmer Hudson
 Manley Ottmer Hudson Papers 1894-1960 via Harvard University

1886 births
1960 deaths
People from St. Peters, Missouri
20th-century American lawyers
International Law Commission officials
Members of the Institut de Droit International
Permanent Court of International Justice judges
Academic staff of the University of Calcutta
Members of the Permanent Court of Arbitration
Harvard University alumni
American officials of the United Nations
American judges of international courts and tribunals
20th-century American judges
Presidents of the American Society of International Law
Members of the International Law Commission